Hagos is a personal name, following the Habesha name system, of Ethiopian and Eritrean origin. Notable people with the name include:

Bahta Hagos (died 1894), a leader of Eritrean resistance to foreign domination
Mesfin Hagos (born 1947), Eritrean politician, Minister of Defence during the 1990s
Yared Hagos (born 1983), Swedish ice hockey player
Hagos Gebrhiwet (born 1994), Ethiopian long-distance runner

Ethiopian given names